The Red River was a passenger train operated by Great Northern Railway between Grand Forks, North Dakota, and Saint Paul, Minnesota.

History 
Great Northern Railway's third new train set of 1950 was a new schedule named the Red River. The five car streamliner built by American Car and Foundry Company began service June 25, 1950, operating a daily round trip  each way between Grand Forks, North Dakota, and Saint Paul, Minnesota. The train went southbound in the morning returning northbound in the evening.

The cars for the Red River streamliner were quite different than those built for the International (another 1950 introduction) in that the Red Rivers cars had extra insulation and the coaches were equipped with Baker Heaters as there was no steam heat available at the Grand Forks depot where the cars stood overnight. The locomotive was sent to the roundhouse each evening for any running repairs and service so the solution was the installation of the Baker Heaters in the cars.

References 

Passenger trains of the Great Northern Railway (U.S.)
Named passenger trains of the United States
Railway services introduced in 1950